The Dominators, collectively known as the Dominion, are a fictional character alien race appearing in comics and other media by DC Comics. Coming from the outer cosmos of the DC Universe, they are highly technologically advanced, and live in a rigid hierarchical society, in which one's caste is determined by the size of a red circle on one's forehead. They are master geneticists who can manipulate the metagene to enhance members of their own caste.

Publication history 
Their first appearance was in 1967, in Adventure Comics #361, a story written by Jim Shooter with art by Curt Swan and Jim Mooney, in which they are presented as possibly dangerous to the Legion of Super-Heroes, but do not pose an actual threat. They appeared again in Legion of Super-Heroes #241–245 in the late 1970s, as an adversarial race in an interstellar conflict with Earth in the 30th century.

In 1988 and 1989, they were revived as the villains of the "Invasion!" crossover event involving many of DC's superhero comics set in the present, written primarily by Keith Giffen and Bill Mantlo and featuring art by Todd McFarlane. Giffen also featured the characters as major villains in the Legion series he was writing with Tom and Mary Bierbaum.

Originally depicted having light blue skin with a white circle on the forehead denoting their social rank, their later more villainous designs with yellow skin and a red circle – introduced in the 1970s and accentuated in the 1980s – has drawn comparisons to "Yellow Peril" stereotypes of east Asians, citing features such as "bald heads, slanted, narrow eyes, long, claw-like fingernails, and dressed in robes".

Fictional history

20th century 
The Dominators were the primary world behind an Alien Alliance that attacked Earth. Their primary motivation for this was their concern at the genetic potential of humanity, as evidenced by the large number of super-powered beings on the Earth of the DC Universe, also known as the metagene.  When the Invasion started to crumble, one Dominator created a 'gene-bomb' and detonated it in Earth's atmosphere that would affect many heroes and villains that possess the metagene.

After the Invasion, a nameless Dominator played a significant role in the comic book one-shot Blasters. This comic features heroes created by Dominator testing; they had wished to examine just how humans tended to gain superpowers. This testing involved running humans through a murderous obstacle course on the partly correct theory that the stress would active their 'meta-genes' and cause superpowers. The 'Blasters', which included former JLA mascot Snapper Carr, are the ones who did gain powers.

In events chronicled in Legion Annual v4 #2, Valor discovered plans for a second invasion of Earth, and thousands of humans held in genetic experimentation tanks. He led a lengthy campaign to liberate them, aided by some of the Dominators (the Diamond Caste) who opposed the policies of their ruling caste. After freeing them, Valor helped settle these modified humans on various worlds which eventually became many of the homeworlds of members of the Legion of Super-Heroes, such as Bismoll, Cargg, Braal, amongst others.

Several Dominators were left on Earth for years and appeared in various comics (usually briefly). One Dominator would come under the control of the Queen Bee, presently the ruler of Bialya (Justice League Europe #4). Though this alien does not survive for long, its technology would cause trouble for the Justice League and the Global Guardians. Others appeared in Captain Atom #52 (the Dominator became a farmer), in the Outsiders #44, in Iron Heights prison in Flash, a mutated Dominator with potent psionic abilities would battle members of the Green Lantern Corps, including Guy Gardner in Green Lantern Corps #7 - 9, and most recently in Superman #668.

The Dominator homeworld fell under siege from the massive horde of Starro the Conqueror. The Dominators at first put up an admirable defense of their planet, however the tide soon turned against the Dominators when Starro himself entered the fray. In the end, the Dominator homeworld fell to Starro and its entire population were converted into Starro's mindslaves, with the exception of a single Dominator Fleet Admiral who had enough individuality to realize the planet was doomed and fled, and became a member of Vril Dox's R.E.B.E.L.S. seeking to defeat Starro.

30th century 
The Dominators fought a long war with the United Planets in the 30th century. Several attempts to establish peace were made. During the Dominators first appearance in Adventure Comics #361, several members of the Legion escorted a Dominion diplomatic team to secret talks, and had to fend off attacks from the Unkillables; descendants of people from Earth and their leader who was another Dominator who was opposed to peace (in this appearance the Dominators were depicted with blue skin as opposed to their later and current yellow hue).

Later, during the Earthwar, the war expanded involving the Khunds, the Dark Circle, and even Mordru, but at the end of it a peace treaty was finally achieved with the Dominion.

"Five Years Later"

The Dominators were the primary opposing force in Legion of Super-Heroes (vol. 4) during its first three years of publication. As depicted therein, the Dominion was able to secretly gain control of the Earth Government (Earthgov) in the aftermath of a galaxy-wide economic collapse. Their primary motivation was still the genetic potential of humans, and they conducted numerous experiments in secret underground chambers. Their role was known only to a few, including Dirk Morgna (Sun Boy), a now former Legionnaire who was hired by the Dominator controlled EarthGov as a public relations liaison.

Due to constant harassment by Earthgov the Legion eventually disbanded, but the Dominators continued to fear its possible reformation, so they freed mass murderer Roxxas from prison and armed him with instructions to kill the former Legion members. He started by killing Blok, but ironically his actions actually helped cause the Legion to reform.

Meanwhile, on Earth, there was an underground resistance movement including ex-Invisible Kid Jacques Foccart, the former Legion of Substitute Heroes, and their unlikely ally Universo.

As safeguards against losing Earth the Dominion laced a series of nuclear explosives in the (inhabited) Moon. This backfired when an insane Dev-Em seized control of the system, and though he was prevented by the members of the Legion and a time-lost Superman from detonating it, one of the Linear Men eventually did, causing a huge catastrophe on Earth. The Dominion attempted to blame the explosion on Khund saboteurs, but their control of Earth started to slip. The Earth was eventually liberated from Dominator control, although some of the Dominators' actions while they controlled Earth eventually led to the destruction of the planet.

The Dominators also attempted to gain control of Daxam, hoping for an army of superbeings, but Glorith destroyed the populace to prevent this from happening.

Post-Zero Hour
Following the Zero Hour reboot, the Dominators played a less significant role in Legion history. The Dominion was one of the core members of the Affiliated Planets ruled by the new Dark Circle. Their representative to the Circle, like the others, was killed by the Dark Circle's leader, Brainiac 4, for opposing her plans.

"Threeboot"
In the "Threeboot" version of Legion continuity, the Dominators were inspired to invade Earth when a time travelling Booster Gold inadvertently led them to believe that fifty-two planets were planning an attack on the Dominion. They managed to seize control of Earth's technology, and sent genetically modified warriors (created using gene grafts from the former members of Terror Firma) through a stargate. The Legion, with the help of the Wanderers, managed to defeat this armada.

The Dominators still had thousands of super-powered troops at their disposal, and would eventually regroup. Under the orders of Cosmic Boy, Mon-El detonated a bomb that seemingly destroyed them. In fact, it imprisoned their entire planet in the Phantom Zone.

Alternative versions
In the Western Justice Riders Elseworld one-shot by Chuck Dixon and J. H. Williams III, a captured Dominator is the source of Maxwell Lord's advanced weaponry.

In other media

Television
 The Dominion appear in the second season of Legion of Super Heroes. They form an alliance with Imperiex to build a superweapon powered by a cloud of cosmic energy, only to be defeated by the eponymous Legion of Super-Heroes.
 The Dominators appear in media set in the Arrowverse.
 They first appear in the crossover "Invasion!" via "cutting-edge prosthetics and computer effects", which executive producer Marc Guggenheim states was done "to achieve a feature film-quality look which is faithful to Invasion! artist Todd McFarlane's interpretation of the characters". Following a previous trip to Earth in the 1950s, they invade Earth in the present in response to the Flash altering history when he created and undid the "Flashpoint" timeline. They abduct and kill the President of the United States before brainwashing most of Earth's heroes and trapping them in a shared simulation to interrogate them for the Flash's location so they can ensure he cannot change history again. However, the heroes refuse to sacrifice their friend and join forces to defeat the Dominators, who are eventually forced to retreat.
 The Dominators make minor appearances in the TV series Supergirl and the crossover "Crisis on Earth-X".
 A Dominator child appears in the TV series Legends of Tomorrow episode "Phone Home", with vocal effects provided by Marc Graue. Having wound up stranded in Ivy Town, they encounter and befriend a young Ray Palmer, who nicknames the alien "Gumball". Upon learning of what happened, the Legends reunite Gumball with their mother, a Dominator queen (voiced by Cissy Jones).

Film
The Dominators make a cameo appearance in Green Lantern: Emerald Knights as one of the first races in the universe who indirectly created the Green Lantern Corps.

Miscellaneous
 Three Dominators appear in Justice League Adventures #21, by John Ostrander & Min S. Ku. They pursue a telepathic girl named Kayla Ardeen, who seeks out the Justice League's help.
 The Dominators appear in Smallville Season 11.

References

DC Comics alien species
Legion of Super-Heroes
Superman characters